Holubka is a popular folk dance from western Ukraine. It is performed by amateurs, professional Ukrainian dance ensembles as well as other performers of folk dances. The literal meaning of holubka (голубка) is a female dove, the male being holub (голуб)

References

Ukrainian dances